A drawer pull (wire pull or simply pull) is a handle to pull a drawer out of a chest of drawers, cabinet or other furniture piece.

A drawer pull often includes a plate to which the handle is fastened. The handle may swing from one or two mounts ("drop handle" or "swing handle"), making a drop drawer pull. A bail handle is a kind of swing handle consisting of an open loop attached to two mounts. The handle may also be fastened to the plate with rivets, making it immovable. The plate may be ornamented by piercing, embossing, or both. The ornament may also be cut on the surface with tools, leaving it sunken into the metal. The stock for handles may be round, rectangular, or irregular forged shapes.

Drawer pulls may also be in one piece, either a handle only or a plate shaped into a grip.

See also
 Cord pull

References

External links
 Engines of Our Ingenuity No. 2824: A Brass Catalogue

Furniture
Cabinets (furniture)